11th Rifle Division can refer to:

11th Rifle Division (Soviet Union)
11th Guards Rifle Division
11th Siberian Rifle Division
11th Motor Rifle Division "Sultan Sanjar"

See also
11th Division (disambiguation)